The Central East Correctional Centre (as known colloquially as the Lindsay Superjail, or simply Lindsay) is a medium/maximum security prison located in Kawartha Lakes, Ontario. Inmates in this facility manufacture licence plates for the province. It is operated by the Ministry of the Solicitor General.

Notable inmates
 Jennifer Pan
 Cameron Briscoe

See also
List of correctional facilities in Ontario

References

External links
 "Correctional Services Facilities - Correctional Centres." Ontario Ministry of Community Safety & Correctional Services. (in French)

Prisons in Ontario
Buildings and structures in Kawartha Lakes